The list of shipwrecks in July 1884 includes ships sunk, foundered, grounded, or otherwise lost during July 1884.

1 July

2 July

3 July

4 July

5 July

6 July

7 July

9 July

10 July

11 July

14 July

15 July

17 July

19 July

22 July

24 July

25 July

27 July

29 July

30 July

31 July

Unknown date

References

1884-07
Maritime incidents in July 1884